Matochkin may refer to:

Yuri Matochkin, Russian politician
Matochkin Strait